Hunt River may refer to:
Hunt River (Alaska), Northwest Arctic Borough, Alaska
Hunt River (Rhode Island)
Hunt River greenstone belt